Broadhall Way, known as the Lamex Stadium for sponsorship purposes, is an association football stadium in Stevenage, Hertfordshire. It has been the home ground of Stevenage (formerly Stevenage Borough and Stevenage Town) since the early 1960s, and has a capacity of 7,800 people.

History

The club plays at Broadhall Way, previously home to Stevenage Town and Stevenage Athletic. Following the bankruptcy of the town's former club, the stadium was not used for three years. The newly formed Stevenage Borough had planned on playing Hitchin Town Youth at Broadhall Way in November 1976 as a "curtain-raiser" for the new venture. Volunteers prepared the pitch in anticipation, but their plans were scuppered when the ex-chairman of Stevenage Athletic – and stadium lease-holder – desecrated the playing surface at Broadhall Way by digging a trench across the full length of the pitch. The club eventually moved into Broadhall Way in 1980 as a result of the council re-purchasing the stadium, and allowed the football club to become its tenant.

Following Stevenage's successful 1995–96 Conference campaign, the Hertfordshire side were denied promotion to the Football League because of insufficient ground capacity and facilities. Consequently, in the early 2000s, the ground was upgraded, with a new £600,000 stand opening, and work on a £5million training facility was announced for nearby Shephalbury Park – which subsequently opened in Autumn 2002. In June 2011, the club secured a 40-acre former sports ground in Bragbury End – with the intention of developing the site into a new training complex. Work began on the development in the summer of 2011, and the staff began to use the complex towards the latter stages of the 2012–13 season.

In January 2009, Stevenage announced that they had signed a seven-figure sponsorship deal with the Lamex Food Group, resulting in the renaming of Broadhall Way to the Lamex Stadium. As a result of the club securing promotion as league champions during the club's 2009–10 campaign, Broadhall Way hosted League football for the first time during the 2010–11 season. The stadium has a capacity of 6,722 people, including 3,142 seats. The capacity was reduced from 7,100 following the club's promotion to the Football League.

Structure and facilities

The ground's pitch includes four stands – the East Terrace, the North Stand, the West Stand, and South Stand. The West Stand is all-seated and covered, and covers the length of the pitch, although it has open corners to either side of the stand. At the back of the stand there are a number of glass-fronted areas to various club offices and executive boxes. The club shop is situated next to the West Stand, opposite to the club's official car-park. Opposite to the West Stand is the East Terrace, which is a covered terrace for home supporters. The terrace has a gable with a clock sitting on its roof above the half-way line, as well as holding a television gantry on its roof.

The North Terrace was situated behind the goal at the north end of the ground and was just seven steps deep. Three-quarters of the terrace was covered, whilst one-quarter was open and without cover. The stand held a capacity of 700 people, and offered facilities for disabled fans. In January 2013, the club announced they were due to present plans to replace the existing North Terrace with a new £1.2 million 1,700 seat stand, although these did not materialise due to "numerous obstacles put in the way". In July 2017, the club asked fans to contribute towards a mini-bond investment scheme, through sports investment platform Tifosy, in an attempt to fund the remaining £500,000 needed to go towards developing the new North Stand. The club stated its desire to open the new stand for the start of the 2018–19 season if the bond scheme was successful. Five weeks after the campaign started, the £500,000 target was met after investment from over 200 fans. A further £100,000 was raised in the following days, meaning a total of £600,000 would be invested in the new North Stand development. The North Terrace was demolished in January 2018. Work on the new North Stand was halted in June 2018 when UK Power Networks refused the club permission to construct a stand around the existing substation. Work restarted in February 2019 when the new substation was installed. The 1,428 all-seater stand was officially opened in December 2019.

Opposite the North Stand is the South Stand, which is a single tiered, all-seated covered stand. The stand was built in 2001, costing £600,000. The South Stand is reserved for away supporters and can hold a capacity of 1,400. The stand also has an electronic scoreboard in the centre of the roof, which was installed in 2001, making it visible to home supporters. The scoreboard was replaced in October 2011. Behind the stand is the supporters' club. A new set of floodlights were installed before the start of the club's 2007–08 campaign.

Other uses
The stadium hosted the England C team, who represent England at non-League level, in January 2003, for a friendly against an Italy XI team. The stadium was also used for an England under-20 match against Czech Republic under-20s in October 2003. The game ended 2–0 to England. In July 2012, the stadium hosted a warm-up friendly between Senegal under-23s and South Korea under-23s, ahead of the 2012 Summer Olympics, with South Korea winning the match 3–0. Additionally, for five years, the ground hosted the Tottenham Hotspur reserve team, with the North London club opting to use Leyton Orient's Brisbane Road for the start of the 2007–08 season due to its more convenient geographical location. Since September 2014, the stadium has once again hosted a number of Tottenham under-21 matches each season.

At the end of the 2005–06 season, Broadhall Way also hosted the Conference South play-off final between St Albans City and Histon; a match that St Albans won 2–0 in front of 3,284 spectators. The following year, the stadium hosted the play-off final once again, where 3,167 were in attendance to watch Salisbury City beat Braintree Town 1–0 to gain promotion to the Conference Premier. It hosted the final for the third, and last time, in May 2008 when Eastbourne Borough beat Hampton & Richmond Borough 2–0. Various charity based matches have also taken place at the ground in recent years.

The stadium hosted its first boxing event on 18 May 2019 when Billy Joe Saunders defeated Shefat Isufi to win the WBO super-middleweight title.

Records

The highest attendance recorded at the stadium was 8,040 for a match against Newcastle United in the FA Cup fourth-round on 25 January 1998. A temporary stand was erected behind the away end to increase the stadium capacity to 8,100, enough to satisfy the FA. The highest attendance recorded for a competitive league match at Broadhall Way is 7,024, when Stevenage played Luton Town in the Conference Premier in April 2010, previously beating the 6,520 attendance when Stevenage played Hereford United in the Conference National play-offs in May 2005. 
The club's lowest attendance whilst playing in the highest tier of non-League football is 879 for a match against Stalybridge Celtic in March 1995. The lowest attendance recorded at the ground for a first-team match is 152 for an Isthmian League match against Billericay Town in August 1987.

The highest seasonal average for Stevenage at Broadhall Way since the club was promoted to the Football Conference in 1994 is 2,748, during the club's 1996–97 campaign. This seasonal average was beaten when the club were promoted into the Football League for the 2010–11 season, averaging 2,960 fans during their first ever season as a Football League team. Attendances continued to improve the following season, in the club's first League One campaign, with the seasonal average sitting at 3,559, the first time the club had averaged over 3,000 spectators. The season was also the first time that over 100,000 fans attended games at Broadhall Way. This figure showed a significant rise in the club's attendances, as it was over double the number of fans who attended games at the stadium during the 2008–09 season. The lowest overall average attendance while the club has been in the top five tiers of English football was in the side's first year in the Conference, in 1994–95, averaging 1,415.

Transport

The ground is located just over a mile away from Stevenage railway station, which is adjacent to the town centre, the station lies on the East Coast Main Line north of King's Cross station.

References

External links

 Broadhall Way at the Football Ground Guide

Football venues in England
Sports venues in Hertfordshire
Stevenage F.C.
Sports venues completed in 1980
English Football League venues